Stian Sortevik (born 17 July 1988) is a Norwegian football player.

Club career

Stabæk Fotball
Having previously played for KFUM Oslo and Hønefoss, Stian Sortevik joined Norwegian Premier League side Stabæk Fotball ahead of the 2012 season.

He played on Norway's 2011 World Cup futsal team.

In 2015, he rejoined KFUM Oslo.

Career statistics

Club

References

External links
 

1988 births
Living people
Footballers from Oslo
Norwegian footballers
Hønefoss BK players
Stabæk Fotball players
KFUM-Kameratene Oslo players
Norwegian Second Division players
Norwegian First Division players
Eliteserien players
Association football midfielders